Tapeworms of the order Cyclophyllidea (the cyclophyllid cestodes) are the most important cestode parasites of humans and domesticated animals.  All have multiple proglottid "segments", and all have four suckers on their scolices (heads), though some may have other structures, as well.  Proglottids of this order have genital openings on one side (except in the  Dilepididae, which have genital openings on both sides), and a compact yolk gland or vitellarium posterior to the ovary.

Families include:
 Dipylidiidae, the most important member of which is Dipylidium caninum, also called the "cucumber tapeworm" or the "double-pore tapeworm"
 Hymenolepididae,  including the genus Hymenolepis, a human parasite
 Taeniidae, which consists of livestock parasites in the genus Taenia and parasites that encyst in humans of the genus Echinococcus
 Anoplocephalidae, which includes several tapeworms of horses and a genus of tapeworms of ruminants, the Moniezia
 Davaineidae, which comprises 14 genera, most of which are parasites of birds

References 

Cestoda
Parasitic helminths of humans
Parasitic animals of mammals
Platyhelminthes orders